Donald Smith (born February 21, 1968) is an American former gridiron football cornerback in the Canadian Football League (CFL) for the Winnipeg Blue Bombers, Memphis Mad Dogs and Toronto Argonauts and Hamilton Tiger-Cats from 1992 to 2000. He also played in the National Football League for the Dallas Cowboys. He played college football at Liberty University.

Early years
Smith attended George Washington High School, where he lettered in football, basketball, and track. He accepted a football scholarship from Liberty University, where he played cornerback and was coached by Sam Rutigliano. As a junior, he registered 5 interceptions. As a senior, he made 3 interceptions. He finished his college career with 26 passes deflected.

Professional career

Minnesota Vikings
Smith was selected by the Minnesota Vikings in the tenth round (271st overall) of the 1990 NFL Draft. He was waived on September 3.

Dallas Cowboys
In 1991, he was signed by the Dallas Cowboys. He played in three games before being released on October 17. On December 6, he was signed to the practice squad.

Winnipeg Blue Bombers
In 1992, he was signed by the Winnipeg Blue Bombers of the Canadian Football League, helping the team reach the Grey Cup finals, while posting 67 defensive tackles, 24 special teams tackles, 3 interceptions and a 71-yard punt return for a touchdown. The next year the team also reached the Grey Cup finals. He was named an East Division All-Star at cornerback in 1993 and 1994.

Memphis Mad Dogs
In 1995, he signed with the Memphis Mad Dogs of the Canadian Football League and was named a South Division All-Star, after registering 50 tackles, 5 interceptions, 12 passes defended and 2 fumble recoveries.

Toronto Argonauts
In 1996, he was signed by the Toronto Argonauts of the Canadian Football League. During his time with the team, he was a part of two Grey Cup Championships (1996 and 1997). He was named an East Division All-Star at cornerback in 1998.

Personal life
From 2001 to 2002, he was an assistant football coach at Liberty University. He is a special education teacher at O.T. Bonner Middle School and a football and wrestling coach at George Washington High School.

References

External links
Football player. Teacher. Coach. Artist

1968 births
Living people
Sportspeople from Danville, Virginia
Players of American football from Virginia
American football defensive backs
Canadian football defensive backs
Dallas Cowboys players
Hamilton Tiger-Cats players
Liberty Flames football players
Memphis Mad Dogs players
Toronto Argonauts players
Winnipeg Blue Bombers players
African-American players of American football
African-American players of Canadian football
Liberty Flames football coaches